The Blonde Gypsy (French: La caraque blonde) is a 1953 French drama film directed by Jacqueline Audry and starring Tilda Thamar, Roger Pigaut and Gérard Landry.

Cast
    Tilda Thamar as Myra Milagros  
 Roger Pigaut as Antoine  
 Gérard Landry as Pedro  
 Orane Demazis as Alida Roux  
 Roland Armontel as Polyte Roux 
 Antonin Berval as Léon Barcarin  
 France Degand as Ginou Barcarin  
 Didier d'Yd as Jean Roux  
 René Hiéronimus as L'huissier  
 Henri Poupon as Le père Barcarin  
 Max Boumendil as Esprit  
 Josselin as Un individu louche 
 Henri Arius 
 François Vibert

References

Bibliography 
 Janis L. Pallister & Ruth A. Hottell. Francophone Women Film Directors: A Guide. Fairleigh Dickinson Univ Press, 2005.

External links 
 

1953 films
1953 drama films
French drama films
1950s French-language films
Films directed by Jacqueline Audry
1950s French films